Make Believe Ballroom is a 1949 American musical romantic comedy directed by Joseph Santley and produced by Ted Richmond. It was loosely based on a radio program of the same name by Martin Block and Al Jarvis. The film starred Jerome Courtland, Ruth Warrick, Ron Randell, Virginia Welles, and Jarvis.

Plot
The film focuses on two carhops as they compete in a mystery record contest. John Reid, in the reference book Popular Pictures of the Hollywood 1940s, commented, "... this is one of those films which string together a musical melange through the excuse of a radio show."

Cast

Jerome Courtland as Gene Thomas
Ruth Warrick as Liza
Virginia Welles as Josie Marlowe
Ron Randell as Professor Leslie Todd
Al Jarvis as himself
Paul Harvey as George Willcox
Sid Tomack as Joe
Louis Jean Heydt as "Jerk" Elliott
Adele Jergens as herself
Frank Orth as "Pop"
Pierre Watkin as radio station manager
Vernon Dent as chef

Musicians featured as themselves in the film included Frankie Laine, The King Cole Trio, Toni Harper, Jack Smith, Kay Starr, The Sportsmen, Charlie Barnet, Jimmy Dorsey, Jan Garber, Pee Wee Hunt, Gene Krupa, and Ray McKinley.

Background
The film's concept dated back to 1932 and Al Jarvis, a disc jockey at radio station KFWB in Los Angeles, California. His daily program, "The World's Largest Make Believe Ballroom", featured popular recordings accompanied by relevant remarks about each one. In 1935, Martin Block began a similar program on WNEW in New York City, with the title shortened to "Make Believe Ballroom".

Filming started 20 September 1948.

The film marked a return to B pictures at Columbia for Ron Randell.

References

External links

1949 films
American romantic musical films
American romantic comedy films
American black-and-white films
Columbia Pictures films
Films directed by Joseph Santley
Films based on radio series
1940s romantic musical films
1949 musical comedy films
American musical comedy films
1949 romantic comedy films
1940s American films